This is a list of states by population in 1 C.E.. Estimates are for the beginning of the year.

World population estimates (1 C.E.) and growth rates (till 1000 C.E.) with 20 current countries

Alternative Estimates of the Regional Components of World Population, 1 C.E. (in thousands)

See also
List of countries by population
List of countries by population in 1000
List of countries by population in 1500
List of countries by population in 1600
List of countries by population in 1700
List of countries by population in 1800
List of political entities in the 1st century

References

0001